Edmonton–Sherwood Park was a federal electoral district in Alberta, Canada, that was represented in the House of Commons of Canada from 2004 to 2015. It was a suburban riding in Edmonton.

History
The electoral district was created in 2003 from Elk Island, Edmonton Centre-East and a small part of the Edmonton North riding. 

It was abolished in 2015. The Edmonton portion became part of Edmonton Manning, while Sherwood Park became part of Sherwood Park—Fort Saskatchewan.

Members of Parliament

This riding elected the following Member of Parliament:

Election results

See also
 List of Canadian federal electoral districts
 Past Canadian electoral districts

References
 
 
 Expenditures - 2008
 Expenditures - 2004

Notes

Former federal electoral districts of Alberta
Fort Saskatchewan
Politics of Edmonton
Sherwood Park